Dennis Wojtkiewicz (born 1956 in Chicago, Illinois) is an American Hyperrealist painter and draughtsman.

Wojtkiewicz graduated from Southern Illinois University and is artist associated with the Hyperrealist movement. He is best known for his large scale renderings of sliced fruit and flowers. In order to achieve his desired effect, technically, Wojtkiewicz relies on traditional oil paint and brushes with a classical application, he also uses pastel for his drawings.

Dennis Wojtkiewicz has exhibited his work in leading fine art galleries in the United States and abroad. His work is owned by many leading private, corporate and public collections including the Evanston Museum of Art, Fidelity Investments in Boston and the University of South Dakota.

Selected solo exhibitions
 2000 M.A. Doran Gallery, Tulsa, OK
 2012 Art Revolution Taipei International Art Fair, Taipei World Trade Center, Taipei, Taiwan
 2014 Sugarman Peterson Gallery, Santa Fe, NM
 2012 Peterson-Cody Gallery, Santa Fe, NM 
 2009 Peterson-Cody Gallery, Santa fe, NM
 2006 J. Cacciola Gallery, New York, NY

Notes

External links
Official Website of Dennis Wojtkiewicz

1956 births
Living people
20th-century American painters
20th-century male artists
American male painters
21st-century American painters
21st-century male artists
Artists from Chicago
Hyperreality
Southern Illinois University alumni